Dmitri Sergeyevich Zornikov (born 28 April 1997) is a Russian football player.

Club career
He made his debut in the Russian Professional Football League for FC Khimki on 23 May 2016 in a game against FC Spartak Kostroma. He made his Russian Football National League debut for Khimki on 12 November 2017 in a game against PFC Krylia Sovetov Samara.

References

External links
 
 Profile by Russian Professional Football League

1997 births
People from Balashikha
Living people
Russian footballers
Association football goalkeepers
FC Khimki players
FC Rotor Volgograd players
FC Inter Cherkessk players
Sportspeople from Moscow Oblast